Heinrich Held (6 June 1868 – 4 August 1938) was a German Catholic politician and Minister President of Bavaria. He was forced out of  office by the Nazi takeover in Germany in 1933.

Biography
Heinrich Held was born in Erbach in the Taunus, then a part of the Prussian province of Hesse-Nassau. His father, Johannes Held, was a local farmer and musician, his mother was Susanne Held née Kaiser.

Held studied law at the universities of Strasbourg, Marburg and Heidelberg before becoming a journalist in Strasbourg in 1896. He moved to Heidelberg the year after and became editor of the Regensburger Morgenblatts, a newspaper in the Bavarian city of Regensburg, in 1899. He moved to take up the same position at the Regensburger Anzeiger the year after. From 1906, he became a co-owner of those two newspapers and began his political career as a speaker in the conservative-Christian workers' movements.
From 1921, Held also served as the president of the Deutscher Katholikentag, a regular gathering and discussion forum for Roman Catholics throughout Germany.

In 1933, Held's son Philipp became one of the first inmates at the Dachau concentration camp. On 4 August 1938, Heinrich Held died in Regensburg.

Political career
Held was elected to the Bavarian parliament in 1907, standing for the Bavarian branch of the Centre Party, and he held his seat there until 1933. He belonged to the left wing of his party and was mainly interested in fiscal politics. He quickly rose to power within the party, becoming his party's leader in the parliament in 1914 and leader of the party itself shortly afterwards. In 1917, Held was elevated to the title of Geheimer Hofrat, a member of the Bavarian Privy council.

In 1918, after the end of the monarchy in Bavaria, Held was one of the co-founders of the Bavarian People's Party (BVP), transforming the Centre's Bavarian branch into a new party which emphasized conservative elements and states' rights. Held remained the parliamentary leader of the new party. In July 1924, after the resignation of Eugen Ritter von Knilling, Held became prime minister of Bavaria. His government was supported by his own party, the national-conservative German National People's Party, the national-liberal German People's Party and the Bauernbund. His policies as prime minister were aimed at reconciliation with the federal government and moving away from separatism. In 1924, he also signed a Concordat with the Holy See.

Held ran in the first round of the 1925 German presidential elections and achieved 3.7 percent of the votes. In the second round, his party supported the right-wing candidate Paul von Hindenburg instead of the Centre Party's candidate Wilhelm Marx. In 1930, Held's government lost its majority in the Bavarian parliament but continued in office as a minority administration. From 1930 to 1932, Held also held the offices of Minister of State for Commerce, Industry and Trade and Minister of State for Agriculture. Both were merged to form the Ministry for the Economy which he held from 1932 to 1933.

Held continued to advocate states rights within the German republic, publishing papers on the subject. In 1932 he sharply criticized the removal of the Prussian prime minister Otto Braun by Chancellor Franz von Papen, a move he considered an unlawful interference by the federal government in state matters. Later in 1932 an attempt, supported by a wide coalition of parties, to counter the Nazis by establishing Rupprecht, Crown Prince of Bavaria, as a Staatskommisar for Bavaria with dictatorial powers failed due to the hesitance of the Bavarian government under Held.

On 9 March 1933, the Bavarian government itself was forcibly removed from office by the Nazis. Initially Held resisted the attempts by the SA to overthrow his government, but he received no support from the German army, who had orders from Berlin to stay out of domestic politics, so that ultimately he could not hold off the Nazis. The office of Bavarian prime minister was abolished and replaced by a Reichsstatthalter, a purely administrative position with no political power. Held retired from politics, first escaping to Lugano, Switzerland, where his son Josef lived, later withdrawing to Regensburg. His government pension as a former prime minister was revoked by the Nazis.

Honors
 Honorary doctorate at the universities of Munich, Innsbruck and Würzburg

See also
 List of Premiers of Bavaria

References

Sources
 Website of the Deutsch Historische Museum, Berlin - Biography of Heinrich Held (in German)
 Opfer und Verfolgte des NS-Regimes aus bayrischen Parlamenten (in German)
 Universitätsbibliothek Regensburg - Bosls bayrische Biographie - Heinrich Held (in German), author: Karl Bosl, publisher: Pustet, page 327

External links
 

1868 births
1938 deaths
People from Limburg-Weilburg
People from Hesse-Nassau
Candidates for President of Germany
German Roman Catholics
Bavarian People's Party politicians
Ministers-President of Bavaria
Members of the Bavarian Chamber of Deputies
University of Strasbourg alumni
University of Marburg alumni
Heidelberg University alumni